James Daws (27 May 1898 – June 1985) was an English professional footballer who played as a right half. He played 75 games in the Football League for Birmingham and Bristol Rovers.

Life and career
Born in Mansfield Woodhouse, Nottinghamshire, Daws began his football career with brief spells as an amateur with Notts County and Mansfield Town, before joining Birmingham in January 1920. In four years with the club he played nearly 50 games, but failed to establish himself as a first-team regular. He moved on to Bristol Rovers, initially as an amateur, then after a couple of months the club paid £250 for his services as a professional player. After one season in Bristol, he returned home for a year, playing for Mansfield Woodhouse F.C., before finishing his career with two seasons as player-trainer of Poole Town. He contributed to the club winning the Western League Division Two in the 1925–26 season, reaching the Third Round Proper of the 1926–27 FA Cup, in which they lost 3–1 to First Division club Everton, and winning the Dorset Senior Cup in both seasons.

He died in Birmingham at the age of 87.

References

1898 births
1985 deaths
People from Mansfield Woodhouse
Footballers from Nottinghamshire
English footballers
Association football wing halves
Notts County F.C. players
Mansfield Town F.C. players
Birmingham City F.C. players
Bristol Rovers F.C. players
Poole Town F.C. players
English Football League players